Spanish traditional Christian music refers to Spanish language Christian music that is usually accompanied by traditional instruments such as the piano, organ, violin, or guitar. Christian or Baptist rondallas are normally the interpreters of this kind of music, though soloists, duos, trios, and groups sing it also. This kind of music is generally released through compact cassettes and compact discs from Baptist churches or from other Christian music institutions. Spanish Traditional Christian music has been made popular in both Mexico and the United States and it has been recently distributed through iTunes also.

List of artists

Soloists
Cathy Flores
Claudia Sánchez
Pastor Hernán Cortés
Alexis Peña
Pastor José Flores
Maricruz Barrios
Maura Ochoa
Mike Allison
Sergio Ramírez

Duos
Dueto Salazar
La Familia Reyes
Oscar y Flory Olivares

Trios
Because of Love Trio

Groups
Ríos de Misericordia
Rondalla Cristiana Sinaí
Rondalla Cristiana Tabernáculo
Rondalla Bautista de Sión
Rondalla Bautista La Gran Comisión
Rondalla Faro Encendido
Rondalla Jerusalén

References

Christian music genres